William O'Callaghan may refer to:
William O'Callaghan (Irish Army officer) (1921–2015), Irish Army officer
William Frederick Ormonde O'Callaghan (1852–1877), Irish MP
William O'Callaghan (politician) (died 1967), Irish senator
Bill O'Callaghan (1868–1946), hurler

See also
William Callaghan (disambiguation)